Rema is a genus of moths of the family Erebidae. The genus was erected by Charles Swinhoe in 1900.

Species
Rema costimacula (Guenée, 1852)
Rema tetraspila (Walker, 1865)

References

Calpinae
Moth genera